Charles Tatham (born 1963) is a Canadian screenwriter and television producer best known for his work on Arrested Development, How I Met Your Mother, and Modern Family.

Biography

Early life
Tatham was born in Listowel, Ontario. He grew up in Guelph and later lived in Waterloo, London, and Bathurst Street. He moved to Los Angeles in 1991 with his brother Jamie to pursue a career in writing in the film and television industry after working in the advertising business for fifteen years in Toronto.

Career
Tatham's first writing job was in 1992 on the sitcom Full House, for which he wrote eight episodes with his brother and writing partner, Jamie, who later quit and returned to Vancouver, while Chuck went on to become a producer in 1994. He then went on to a number of simultaneous writer-producer jobs on sitcoms including Suddenly Susan, Oh, Grow Up, Less Than Perfect, The Jake Effect and Andy Barker, P.I., the latter four of which he served as a co-executive producer. His most notable (and acclaimed) role, however, has been as a writer and co-executive producer for the comedy series Arrested Development from 2005 to 2006. He was nominated for two Emmys in 2006; the first shared with the show's other producers in the category of Outstanding Comedy Series, and the second shared with three other writers of the episode "Development Arrested" in the Outstanding Writing for a Comedy Series category. He has also, with the rest of the Arrested Development writing crew, been nominated for two Writers Guild of America Awards, in 2005 and 2006, both in the Comedy Series category.

He fully supported the 2007–2008 Writers Guild of America strike, which stalled a project he had with Ron Howard developing a new series, The Church of Reggie, about a man who starts his own religion on his porch.

In 2020, he signed on as an executive producer on the forthcoming Canadian sitcom Children Ruin Everything.

Personal life
He is married to Joanne Tatham, a jazz singer, with whom he has two sons. He enjoys hockey and slow marathons and is allergic to bananas.

References

External links
 

1963 births
Living people
Canadian male screenwriters
Canadian television writers
Canadian television producers
People from Perth County, Ontario
Writers from Ontario
20th-century Canadian screenwriters
20th-century Canadian male writers
21st-century Canadian screenwriters
21st-century Canadian male writers